Gaskiers-Point La Haye is a town in Newfoundland and Labrador, Canada, located in St. Mary's Bay. It is located southwest of St. Mary's. It became a local government community in 1970. In 2021, the town had a population of 189.

Demographics 

Local attractions
Hare Hill Trail (Point La Haye) is a well-developed trail that was originally used by wood cutters, hunters and berry pickers for centuries. The trail is a total of three kilometres long and reaches an elevation of 135 m at its highest point. Upon reaching the top, there is a view of many communities in St. Mary's Bay.

Towns and communities nearby
 Admiral's Beach
 Mosquito
 St. Mary's
 St. Vincent's-St. Stephen's-Peter's River
 Riverhead

See also
St. Mary's Bay
Newfoundland outport
Avalon Peninsula
List of municipalities in Newfoundland and Labrador

References

Populated coastal places in Canada
Towns in Newfoundland and Labrador